The Great Plague in the late Ming dynasty, also known as the North China Plague in the late Ming dynasty, or the Great Plague of Jingshi, was a major plague epidemic between 1633 and 1644, the last phase of the Ming dynasty in China, during the Chongzhen Emperor's reign (1627–1644). The epidemic started in Shanxi Province in 1633, and reached Beijing in 1641, where the plague caused the deaths of more than 200,000 people in 1643, directly contributing to the collapse of the Ming dynasty in 1644.

Brief history 
In 1633, during the sixth year of Chongzhen’s reign, the plague epidemic started in Shanxi Province.

In 1641, the plague arrived in Beijing, capital of the Ming dynasty. At the same time, historical records indicate that more than half of the population in northern Zhejiang fell ill in 1641, and 90% of the local people died in 1642.

In 1643, the epidemic reached its peak, killing more than 200,000 people in Beijing alone, accounting for 20%-25% of the local population. The “pimple plague” and “vomit blood plague,” recorded in Chinese literature at the time, were possibly bubonic plague and pneumonic plague.

In March 1644, Beijing was under siege by Li Zicheng's troops, whereas the defending force in Beijing weakened significantly due to the plague, with some 50,000 soldiers left–down from the original 100,000. Soon, Li won the Battle of Beijing and the Chongzhen Emperor committed suicide, marking the end of the Ming dynasty.

Wu Youke (1582–1652) developed the idea that some diseases were caused by transmissible agents, which he called Li Qi (戾气 or pestilential factors) when he observed various epidemics rage around him between 1641 and 1644. His book Wen Yi Lun (瘟疫论，Treatise on Pestilence/Treatise of Epidemic Diseases) can be regarded as the main etiological work that brought forward the concept.

See also 

 Second plague pandemic
 List of epidemics
 Shun dynasty
 Qing dynasty

References 

Second plague pandemic
17th-century epidemics